Kosmos 379 ( meaning "Cosmos 379") was an unmanned test of the LK (the Soviet counterpart of the Apollo Lunar Module) in Earth orbit.

Mission
Earth orbit simulated propulsion system operations of a nominal lunar landing mission. Kosmos 379 entered a 192 to 232 km low Earth orbit. After three days it fired its motor to simulate hover and touchdown on the moon, in imitation of a descent to the lunar surface after separation of the Blok D lunar crasher propulsion module. The engine firing changed its orbit from 192 km X 233 km to 196 km X 1206 km (delta-V = 263 m/s).

After a simulated stay on the Moon, it increased its speed by 1.518 km/s, simulating ascent to lunar orbit making the final apogee 14,035 km.
These main maneuvers were followed by a series of small adjustments simulating rendezvous and docking with the Soyuz 7K-L3. The LK lander tested out without major problems and decayed from orbit on September 21, 1983.

Parameters
 Spacecraft: T2K
 Mass: 5500 kg
 Crew: None
 Launched: November 24, 1970
 Landed: Reentered September 21, 1983
 Orbit: 192 km

References

External links

 Mir Hardware Heritage
Mir Hardware Heritage - NASA report (PDF format)
Mir Hardware Heritage (wikisource)

Kosmos satellites
Soviet lunar program
1970 in the Soviet Union
Spacecraft launched in 1970